Nuzvid railway station (station code:NZD), is the railway station under the jurisdiction of Indian Railways. It serves Hanuman Junction and Nuzvid town situated in the Krishna district of Andhra Pradesh. Nuzvid railway station falls under Vijayawada railway division of South Central Railway zone. It is situated on the Howrah–Chennai main line. It is one of the 27 rural stations in the state to have Wi-Fi.

Classification 
In terms of earnings and outward passengers handled, Nuzvid is categorized as a Non-Suburban Grade-5 (NSG-5) railway station. Based on the re–categorization of Indian Railway stations for the period of 2017–18 and 2022–23, an NSG–5 category station earns between – crore and handles  passengers.

See also 

Visakhapatnam–Vijayawada section

References

External links 
 Indian Railways website

Railway stations in Krishna district
Vijayawada railway division